Jar City (Icelandic: Mýrin – "The Bog") is a 2006 Icelandic film directed by Baltasar Kormákur. It is based on Mýrin, a 2000 novel written by Arnaldur Indriðason and released in English as Jar City.

Kormákur is in the midst of producing an English-language remake, also called Jar City, which will be set in Louisiana.

Plot
A world-weary cop comes to believe a recent murder of a middle-aged man is linked to a case of possible rape three decades earlier by a group of friends and a corrupt cop. Working through, he finds it linked to neurofibromatosis, a rare disease among Nordics. One thing leads to another and he puts the pieces together. A geneticist father loses his child to neurofibromatosis and his search for answers leads to his degenerate father and unravels many missing person cases during the decade.

Like the book on which it is based, the film is implicitly a semi-critique of the gene-gathering work of the Icelandic company deCODE genetics.

Cast
 Ingvar E. Sigurðsson as Erlendur
 Ágústa Eva Erlendsdóttir as Eva Lind
 Björn Hlynur Haraldsson as Sigurður Óli
 Ólafía Hrönn Jónsdóttir as Elínborg 
 Atli Rafn Sigurðsson as Örn
 Kristbjörg Kjeld as Katrín
 Þorsteinn Gunnarsson as Holberg
 Theódór Júlíusson as Elliði
 Þórunn Magnea Magnúsdóttir as Elín
 Guðmunda Elíasdóttir as Theodóra
 Walter Grímsson as Handrukkarar
 Sveinn Ólafur Gunnarsson
 Magnús Ragnarsson as Lögfræðingur
 Rafnhildur Rósa Atladóttir as Kola
 Jón Sigurbjörnsson as Albert

Soundtrack
The score was composed by Mugison.

Track listing:
 "Til eru fræ"
 "Sveitin milli sanda"
 "Bíum bíum bambaló"
 "Erlendur"
 "Elliði"   
 "Á Sprengisandi"
 "Fyrir átta árum"
 "Áfram veginn – Nikka"
 "Áfram veginn"
 "Halabalúbbúlúbbúlei"
 "Malakoff"
 "Bí bí og blaka I"
 "Myrra"
 "Kirkjuhvoll"
 "Bí bí og blaka II"
 "Dagný"
 "Heyr, Ó Guđ raust mína"
 "Lyrik"
 "Nú hnígur sól"
 "Sofðu unga ástin mín"
 "Ódur til Hildigunnar" 
 "Svefnfræ"
 "Fræsvefn"
 "Svefnfræ, söngur"
 "Nú legg ég augun aftur"

Incidental music:
Extract from George Frideric Handel's "The Arrival of the Queen of Sheba" from the oratorio Solomon

Prizes
The film was awarded the 2007 Crystal Globe Grand Prix at the 42nd Karlovy Vary International Film Festival. It also won the Breaking Waves Award at the 15th Titanic International Film Festival in Budapest with a €10,000 prize; the film was screened with the title Bloodline.

DVD
A Blockbuster Exclusive Region 1 DVD was released in the U.S. and Canada. Otherwise, the film was not released commercially in America. It has also been released on DVD in Europe and is available on iTunes.

References

External links
 
 

2000s thriller films
2006 films
Films based on Icelandic novels
Films directed by Baltasar Kormákur
Films set in Iceland
Films about murder
Icelandic thriller films
Police detective films
Crystal Globe winners
2000s Icelandic-language films